{{DISPLAYTITLE:C14H19N3S}}
The molecular formula C14H19N3S (molar mass: 261.39 g/mol, exact mass: 261.1300 u) may refer to:

 Methapyrilene
 Thenyldiamine

Molecular formulas